Heavens Gate was a German heavy metal band from Wolfsburg, Germany.

They started out as a band called Steeltower in 1982, releasing their first record Night of the Dog in 1984. 

Before signing with No Remorse records, they were known under the name of Carrion and several of their songs ended up re-worked on their debut album In Control. They changed their name to Heavens Gate in 1987. Their first record as Heavens Gate was released in 1989. They were, together with German bands Helloween, Gamma Ray, Grave Digger, Running Wild, and Rage, the pioneers in German power metal, taking their influences mainly from Helloween as well as from Judas Priest. 

Heavens Gate were taken under the wing of Frank Bornemann (Eloy) and soon after releasing In Control, they were embraced by the German metal audience and had an enthusiastic response in Japan.

They also did a metal cover of "Always Look on the Bright Side of Life" by Monty Python, from the movie The Life of Brian, for the Hell for Sale! album.

Members

Last known lineup 
 Thomas Rettke – vocals (1982–1999)
 Sascha Paeth – guitars (1987–1999)
 Bonny Bilski – guitars (1987–1999)
 Robert Hunecke-Rizzo – bass (1996–1999)
 Thorsten Müller – drums (1982–1999)

Former members 
 Ingo Millek – guitars (1982–1987)
 Bernd Kaufholz – guitars (1987–1985)
 Manni Jordan – bass (1987–1995)

Timeline

Discography

Studio albums 
 Night of the Dog - 1984 (As Steeltower)
 In Control – 1989
 Livin' in Hysteria – 1991
 Hell for Sale! – 1992
 Planet E. – 1996
 Menergy – 1999

Live albums 
 Live for Sale! – 1993

EPs 
 Open the Gate and Watch! – 1990
 More Hysteria – 1992
 In the Mood – 1997

Compilations 
 Boxed – 1999
 Best for Sale! – 2015

References

External links 
 Heavens Gate @ Masters of Metal

German power metal musical groups
German heavy metal musical groups
Musical groups established in 1982
Musical groups disestablished in 1999
Musical quintets
1982 establishments in Germany